The Dnieper–Bug Canal (alternatively the Dnepr-Bug Canal), or the Dneprovsko-Bugsky Canal is the longest inland ship canal in Belarus. It connects the Mukhavets River (a tributary of the Bug River) and the Pina River (a tributary of the Pripyat River).

Originally the canal was named the Royal Canal, after the King of Poland Stanisław August Poniatowski, who initiated its construction. It forms an important part of the transportation artery linking the Baltic Sea and the Black Sea. The canal system comprises:

 the western slope from Brest to Kobrin
 a  stretch of the Mukhavets River with regulated water-level
 a  summit pound
 the eastern slope,  stretch of the canal
 a  stretch of the Pina River with regulated water-level

The drainage area of the canal system totals .

History

Origins 
Canal building flourished in the Polish–Lithuanian Commonwealth in the late 18th century. Yet many of the early canals are no longer in active service, having been superseded by railroads and highways. The Dnieper–Bug Canal after several enlargements still provides a convenient inland waterway. Until the 18th century there was a portage between Kobrin and Pinsk as it was a part of the important long-distance trade route from the Black Sea to the Baltic Sea. The names of the Voloka River and the village of Mukhovloki near Kobrin reflect the existence of the ancient portage. People have settled along the portage route since ancient times due to the importance of the (Trade route from the Varangians to the Greeks).

Proposal and design 
In the mid-17th century, Jerzy Ossoliński, Crown Court Treasurer of the Polish–Lithuanian Commonwealth was the first to suggest the idea of upgrading the portage to a canal with locks. The work started 120 years later. In 1770, the canal was planned by the prominent cartographer Franciszek Florian Czaki.

Construction and operation 
The canal was built in 1775-1784 during the reign of Stanisław August Poniatowski, the last king of the Polish–Lithuanian Commonwealth. Originally it was named Kanał Królewski, after the Polish king, since he was the initiator of the project. Additional work was carried out starting in 1837 by the Russian Empire and completed around 1846–1848. To supply the canal system with water, mainly the canal pound, Beloozerski and Orekhovski watercourses were started in 1839 and completed in 1843. The number of movable weirs between Brest and Pinsk reached 22. As a result, the canal became navigable for bigger vessels, in particular steamers, at any time from spring till autumn. In 1847, the Kanał Królewski was renamed the  Dneprovo-Bugski Canal.

Decline and abandonment 
After the construction of the railway along the canal in the late 19th century the canal was used mostly for rafting lumber, exported to western countries. During World War I, the canal was not in use.

Reconstruction 
During the 1920s, it was partly rebuilt anew for the Riverine Flotilla of the Polish Navy, better known as the Pinsk Flotilla. The Flotilla was the inland branch of the Polish Navy operating in the area of the Pinsk Marshes between the Polish-Bolshevik War and World War II. During the 1920s, two locks were built.

In 1940, the Soviet authorities initiated a large-scale reconstruction of the canal. Eight locks were built replacing movable weirs.

Navigation on the Dnieper–Bug Canal is interrupted by weirs on the rivers Mukhavets and Bug near Brest, Belarus, the border town. That is the only place that, for the time being, makes the navigation from Western Europe to Belarus and Ukraine through inland waterways impossible. The waterways from the German-Polish border (Oder River, through the Warta, Brda and Noteć rivers, Bydgoszcz Canal, Vistula River, Narew River, Bug River) once used to link the Belarus and Ukrainian inland waterways via Mukhavets River, Dnieper–Bug Canal, Pripyat River and Dnieper River), thus connecting north-western Europe with the Black Sea.

Decline and renewal 
Recently the dam in the Bug, making it impossible for ships to pass, has led to considerable neglect of the most western part of the Mukhavets; some of the locks have been filled in and Brest Harbor can only be reached by vessels approaching from the east.

More recently efforts have been undertaken to restore the canal to a class IV inland waterway of international importance. In 2003 the Government of the Republic of Belarus adopted an inland water transport and sea transport development program to rebuild the Dnieper–Bug Canal shipping locks to meet the standards of a class Va European waterway. It is expected that reconstruction will continue over the next few years.

Footnotes

External links

 2008 report on the canal
 website in Russian of the company that operates the canal

Transport in Belarus
Canals in Belarus
Canals opened in 1784